The group stage for the 2021 Malaysia Cup will be played from 25 September to 10 November. It will feature 16 teams who were drawn to 4 groups with 4 teams in each.

Draw
The draw for the group stage was held on 15 September 2021 at 14:00 MYT (UTC+8).

Schedule
The schedule of each matchday is as follows:

Groups
All times are on Malaysia Standard Time (UTC+8).

Group A

Group B

Group C

Group D

Notes

References

External links

2021 in Malaysian football